The 2018 Wyre Forest District Council election took place on 3 May 2018 to elect members of the Wyre Forest District Council in Worcestershire, England. They were held on the same day as other local elections.

Council Composition

After the election

Ward results

Aggborough & Spennells 

Peter Dyke was elected.

Areley Kings & Riverside 

James Alexander Shaw was elected but resigned in November 2018 citing ill-health.

Bewdley & Rock 
Nick Harris was elected and became the youngest Councillor in the UK.

Blakebrook & Habberley South 

Tracey Onslow was elected.

Broadwaters

Foley Park & Hoobrook

Franche & Habberley North

Mitton

Offmore & Comberton

Wribbenhall & Arley

Wyre Forest Rural

By-elections between 2018 and 2019

References 

Wyre Forest District Council elections
District council elections in England